Fuchsia lycioides or the Box-thorn Fuchsia is a species of Fuchsia found in Chile at elevations of 0 – 100 meters It is the only species in Section Kierschlegeria

References

External links
 
 

lycioides
Chilean Matorral
Flora of Chile
Taxa named by Henry Cranke Andrews